Surabaya Muda (en: Young Surabaya) is an Indonesian football club based in Surabaya, East Java. They currently compete in the Liga 3.

References

External links
Liga-Indonesia.co.id

Football clubs in Indonesia
Football clubs in East Java
Association football clubs established in 2010
2010 establishments in Indonesia